RS Mistral is a container ship owned by Romy Shipping and operated by AS Myklebusthaug Management AS. Originally owned by CV Scheepvaartonderneming Westersingel, she has had three owners, been registered under three flags, and been renamed eight times.

Construction
Then named Westersingel, the ship's keel was laid on 8 June 1998 at Schiffswerft und Maschinenfabrik Cassens GmbH in Emden, Germany.

The ship's gross tonnage, a measure of the volume of all its enclosed spaces, is 7,541. Its net tonnage, which measures the volume of the cargo spaces, is 3,432.

The vessel was built with a MAK 8 M552 C 6000 kW-8160 bhp main engine which drives a controllable-pitch propeller. The ship also features 2  Caterpillar 3512 DITA auxiliary generators, backed-up by a 96 kW emergency diesel generator.

RS Mistral has two port-side cargo cranes.  Ships with cranes, known as geared ships, are more flexible in that they can visit ports that are not equipped with pierside cranes.  However, having cranes on board also has drawbacks.  This added flexibility incurs some costs greater recurring expenses, such as maintenance and fuel costs.  The United Nations Council on Trade and Development characterizes geared ships as a "niche market only appropriate for those ports where low cargo volumes do not justify investment in port cranes or where the public sector does not have the financial resources for such investment."

Construction of the ship was completed in 1999.  , the ship is classified by Det Norske Veritas with the code "100 A5 E General cargo ship with double hull Equipped for carriage of containers SOLAS-II-2, Reg.19", meaning that it was constructed under the supervision of a recognized classification society, that the construction complies with the society's rules, that it is classed as a general cargo carrier and container ship, and that it is designed to be operated with unattended machinery spaces.

Current Service
As of November 2018, RS Mistral runs the Maersk Line Z42 Malta - Durrës Empties service. Every 5 days, the vessel makes the round trip between Marsaxlokk, Malta, and Durrës, Albania, taking 2 days between Malta and Albania, and 3 days from Albania to Malta.

Notes

References

Merchant ships
1999 ships